This Earth of Mankind is a 2019 Indonesian historical romance drama film, directed by Hanung Bramantyo and written by Salman Aristo. The film was adapted from 1980 novel of the same name by Pramoedya Ananta Toer. It starred Iqbaal Ramadhan, Mawar Eva de Jongh and Sha Ine Febriyanti.

Premise
This Earth of Mankind tells the story of Minke, a Javanese royal who falls in love with an Indo woman named Annelies, a daughter of Nyai Ontosoroh.

Cast

Release
This Earth of Mankind had its premiere on 9 August 2019 in Surabaya, East Java, along with The Fugitive, another film adapted from Toer's novel of the same name. The film was released theatrically in Indonesia on 15 August 2019. It garnered 1,316,583 spectators during its theatrical run and grossed Rp52.6 million (US$3,355,943).

Accolades

References

External links

2010s Indonesian-language films
2010s historical drama films
2010s historical romance films
2019 romantic drama films
Films directed by Hanung Bramantyo